Joan Barclay (born Mary Elizabeth Greear; August 31, 1914 – November 22, 2002) was an American film actress of the 1930s and 1940s, starring mostly in B-movies and cliffhangers, with her career starting during the silent film era.

Biography

Early life and career
The daughter of Mr. and Mrs. P. H. Greear, Barclay was born in Minneapolis, Minnesota. A 1923 newspaper item reported that she was "a singer and player" whose bird imitations had been broadcast on radio.

Her family moved to California when she was still a child due to her mother's wishing to escape the cold climate of the north. Moving to Hollywood to pursue acting, Barclay received her first role at the age of 12, which was credited with her billed as Geraine Greear, in the 1927 film The Gaucho, starring Douglas Fairbanks and Lupe Vélez. It was her only silent film. In 1930, still billed as Geraine Greear, she had a minor role in King of Jazz. From 1932–35 she had thirteen uncredited film roles. She was the leading lady opposite Tom Tyler in the 1936 Western film Ridin' On.

Career in B-movies
In 1936, Barclay's career changed for the better when she began starring in westerns opposite some of Hollywood's leading cowboy stars, including Tom Tyler, Hoot Gibson, and Tom Keene. Her first western starring role was opposite Tom Tyler in Ridin' On, followed by Feud of the West alongside Hoot Gibson, Glory Trail with Tom Keene, and Men of the Plains with Rex Bell, all in 1936. That year she received roles in other B-movies that were not westerns as well, including the 1936 crime drama Prison Shadows, which starred Lucille Lund and Edward J. Nugent, and the action/adventure film Phantom Patrol starring opposite Kermit Maynard.

From early 1936 to 1939, Barclay had both starring and supporting roles in 35 films, almost all of which were B-movies, mainly westerns, serials, or cliffhangers. Most had her playing the role of the heroine opposite the film's hero. During the latter part of the 1930s she starred alongside such cowboy stars as Slim Whitaker, Tim McCoy, Ben Corbett, Tex Fletcher, Bob Baker and also rejoined Edward J. Nugent in the 1937 adventure film Island Captives.

Later years
By 1940, Barclay was working steadily, averaging better than six films per year. From 1940 to 1945 she appeared in thirty four films. However, by 1943 she had begun receiving more and more uncredited roles, a trend which would only increase with time. In 1944 she appeared in six films, four of which were uncredited. In 1945, she starred in the Charlie Chan mystery The Shanghai Cobra. It was her last film.

Personal life
Barclay married three times, with two children by her second marriage, to Leroy Hillman, whom she wed on July 2, 1945, in Las Vegas. Her last marriage was to George Sullivan, with whom she remained until his death. The couple eventually settled in Palm Desert, California.

Death
Barclay died in Palm Desert, California, on November 22, 2002, aged 88. She was buried in Forest Lawn Memorial Park, Glendale, California.

Selected filmography
 
 Feud of the West (1936) as Molly Henderson
Prison Shadows (1936) as Mary Comstock
Men of the Plains (1936) as Laura Long
Island Captives (1937) as Helen Carsons
The Trusted Outlaw (1937) as Betty Pember
 Sky Racket (1937) as Marion Bronson
 Whirlwind Horseman (1938) as Peggy Radford
 Pioneer Trail (1938) as Alice Waite
 Two Gun Justice (1938) as Nancy Brown
The Gentleman from Arizona (1939) as Georgia Coburn
 Outlaws' Paradise (1939) as Jessie Treadwell
 Billy the Kid's Range War (1941) as Ellen Gorman
 Billy the Kid's Round-Up (1941) as Betty Webster
 Billy the Kid's Smoking Guns (1942) as Mrs. Howard
Around the World (1943) (uncredited)
Rookies in Burma (1943) as Connie
 Ladies' Day (1943) as Joan Samuels
 Bombardier (1943) (uncredited)
 The Falcon in Danger (1943) as Hysterical girl
 Step Lively (1944) as Western Union clerk (uncredited)
Music in Manhattan (1944) as Chorus girl
Youth Runs Wild (1944) as Girl with Blanche (uncredited)
 The Falcon Out West (1944) as Mrs. Irwin
The Shanghai Cobra (1945) as Paula Webb

References

External links

 
 
 
 

1914 births
2002 deaths
American silent film actresses
American film actresses
Actresses from Minneapolis
Actresses from Minnesota
20th-century American actresses
Burials at Forest Lawn Memorial Park (Glendale)